Montenegro competed at the 2015 European Games, in Baku, Azerbaijan from 12 to 28 June 2015.

Medalists

References

Nations at the 2015 European Games
European Games
2015